Hoseynabad-e Arab (also Romanized as Ḩoseynābād-e ʿArab; also known as Ḩoseynābād) is a village in Eshqabad Rural District, Miyan Jolgeh District, Nishapur County, Razavi Khorasan Province, Iran. At the 2006 census, its population was 108, in 28 families.

References 

Populated places in Nishapur County